Henry William Woltman (16 June 1889 – 1 November 1964) was an American neurologist and the first neurologist at the Mayo Clinic in Rochester, MN. In his career as a research and clinical neurologist he discovered several new diseases, several of which still bear his name, including: Moersch-Woltman syndrome, the Woltman sign. Woltman obtained a BS in 1911 before proceeding to medical school.

Upon his death, he was survived by his wife and four children.

References

American neurologists
1964 deaths
1889 births